The 2020 Girls' Youth European Volleyball Championship was the 14th edition of the Girls' Youth European Volleyball Championship, a biennial international volleyball tournament organised by the European Volleyball Confederation (CEV) the girls' under-17 national teams of Europe. The tournament was held in Montenegro from 1 to 9 October 2020.

Same as previous editions, the tournament acted as the CEV qualifiers for the FIVB Volleyball Girls' U18 World Championship. The top six teams qualified for the 2021 FIVB Volleyball Girls' U18 World Championship as the CEV representatives.

Qualification 

The second round qualifying stage for the final tournament was cancelled due to the COVID-19 pandemic by the CEV on 15 June 2020. First round qualifiers were Serbia, Russia, Slovakia, Finland and Italy.
The remaining six participants were determined from European Ranking after the respective National Federations confirmed their participation in the event. Despite securing their spot through winning the NEVZA qualifying event, Finland have withdrawn from the competition. The next best team from the relevant European Ranking – Poland – has taken their spot.

Pools composition
The drawing of lots was combined with a seeding of National Federations and performed as follows:
The host country Montenegro were seeded in Preliminary Pool I. Top country per  European Ranking, Russia were seeded in Pool II.
Remaining 10 participating teams drawn after they were previously placed in five cups as per their position in the latest European Ranking

Result

Before the start of the tournament it was announced that Germany have withdrawn due to travel restrictions imposed by COVID-19 pandemic.

Preliminary round

Pool I

|}

|}

Pool II

|}

|}

5th–8th classification

5th–8th semifinals

|}

7th place match

|}

5th place match

|}

Final round

Semifinals

|}

3rd place match

|}

Final

|}

Final standing

Awards
At the conclusion of the tournament, the following players were selected as the tournament dream team.

Most Valuable Player
  Arina Fedorovtseva
Best Setter
  Özge Arslanalp
Best Outside Spikers
  Arina Fedorovtseva
  Melisa Ege Bükmen

Best Middle Blockers
  Natalia Suvorova
  Hena Kurtagić
Best Opposite Spiker
  Pelin Eroktay
Best Libero
  Emma Barbero

References

External links
Official website

Girls' Youth European Volleyball Championship
Europe
Volleyball
International volleyball competitions hosted by Montenegro
Volleyball European Championship (girls)
Volleyball